Balkanization is the fragmentation of a larger region or state into smaller regions or states, which may be hostile or uncooperative with one another. It is usually caused by differences of ethnicity, culture, and religion and some other factors such as past grievances. The term is pejorative; when sponsored or encouraged by a sovereign third party, it has been used as an accusation against such third party nations. Controversially, the term is often used by voices for the status quo to underscore the dangers of acrimonious or runaway secessionism. Balkanization is a type of political fragmentation.

Nations and societies

The term (coined in the early 19th century) refers to the division of the Balkan peninsula, which was ruled almost entirely by the Ottoman Empire, into a number of smaller states between 1817 and 1912. It came into common use in the immediate aftermath of the First World War, with reference to the many new states that arose from the collapse of the Austro-Hungarian Empire and the Ottoman Empire.

Uses to stir opinion

Countries in Europe, where uniting quite recently historically distinct peoples or nations, have seen outspoken separatists. These have prompted reactionary voices fearing Balkanization. The Iberian Peninsula, especially Spain, has from the time of Al-Andalus (ending in 1492) seen voices fearing disorderly rupture. Its main separatist movements today are Basque separatism and Catalan independentism.

Canada is a stable country but has separatist movements, the strongest of which is the Quebec sovereignty movement, which seeks to create a nation-state in Quebec, which encompasses the majority of Canada's French-Canadian population. Two referendums have been held to decide the question, one in 1980 and one in 1995. Both were lost by the separatists, the latter by a small margin. Less mainstream and smaller movements also exist in the Canadian Prairie, especially Alberta, to protest what is seen as domination by Quebec and Ontario of Canadian politics. Saskatchewan Premier Roy Romanow also considered separation from Canada if the 1995 referendum had succeeded, which would have led to the balkanization of Canada.

Quebec has been the scene of a small but vociferous partition movement from the part of Anglo-Quebecers activist groups opposed to the idea of independence of Quebec since 80% of the province is francophone. One such project is the Proposal for the Province of Montreal for the establishment of a separate province from Quebec for Montreal's strongly-anglophone and allophone (mother tongue neither English nor French) communities.

In January 2007, the growing support for Scottish independence made Chancellor of the Exchequer of the United Kingdom and later Prime Minister Gordon Brown talk of a "Balkanisation of Britain". Independence movements in the United Kingdom also exist in England, Wales, Cornwall and Northern England (themselves parts of England) and Northern Ireland.

In Africa

Bates, Coatsworth & Williamson argued Balkanization was observed greatly in West Africa then British East Africa. In the 1960s, countries in the  started to opt for "autonomy within the French community" in the postcolonial era. Countries in the CFA franc zone were allowed to impose tariffs, regulate trade and manage transport services.

Zambia, Zimbabwe, Malawi, Uganda and Tanzania achieved independence toward the end of when the Great Powers postcolonial era came about. The period also saw the breakdown of the Federation of the Rhodesias and Nyasaland as well as the East African High Commission. Splintering into today's nations was a result of the movement towards a closed economy. Countries were adopting antitrade and anti-market policies. Tariff rates were 15% higher than in OECD countries during the 1970s and 1980s. Furthermore, countries took approaches to subsidise their own local industries, but the interior markets were small in scale. Transport networks were fragmented; regulations on labor and capital flow were increased; price controls were introduced. Between 1960 and 1990, balkanization led to disastrous results. The GDP of these regions were one tenth of OECD countries. Balkanization also resulted in what van de Valle called "typically fairly overvalued exchanged rates" in Africa. Balkanization contributed to what Bates, Coatsworth & Williamson claimed to be a lost decade in Africa.

Economic stagnation ended only in the mid-1990s. Countries within the region started to input more stabilization policies. What was originally a high exchange rate eventually fell to a more reasonable exchange rate after devaluations in 1994. By 1994, the number of countries with an exchange rate 50 percent higher than the official exchange rate had decreased from 18 to four. However, there is still limited progress in improving trade policies within the region, according to van de Walle. In addition, the post-independent countries still rely heavily on donors for development plans. Balkanization still has an impact on today's Africa. However, this causation narrative is not popular in many circles.

In the Levant
During the 1980s, the Lebanese academic and writer Georges Corm used the term balkanization to describe attempts by supporters of Israel to create buffer states based on ethnic backgrounds in the Levant in order to protect Israeli sovereignty. In 2013 the French journalist Bernard Guetta writing in the Libération newspaper applied the term to:

Lebanon's political division between Muslims, Christians and Druze.
The Syrian Civil War.

See also

 Breakup of Yugoslavia
 Balkan Wars
 Balkan Federation
 Cuius regio, eius religio
 Detachment (territory)
 Dissolution of the Ottoman Empire
 Dissolution of Austria-Hungary
 Dissolution of the Soviet Union
 Feudal fragmentation
 Kleinstaaterei
 Lebanonization
 Pillarisation
 Protracted social conflict
 Secession
 Self-determination
 Self-governance
 Sovereignty
 Treaty of Sèvres
 Treaty of Trianon
 Westphalian sovereignty

References

Citations

Bibliography

External links
 

1810s neologisms
19th century in the Ottoman Empire
 Balkans
 Geopolitical terminology
 Metaphors referring to places
 Political terminology
Politics by region
Sectarian violence
Separatism
Political slurs